The 1993 Women's African Volleyball Championship was the Sixth Edition African continental volleyball Championship for women in Africa and it was held in Lagos, Nigeria, with Ten teams participated.

Teams

Final ranking

References

1993 Women
African championship, Women
Women's African Volleyball Championship
International volleyball competitions hosted by Nigeria